is a five-part drama that aired on Fuji TV. It first aired in Japan from November 19, 1992 to December 17, 1992. It features a theme song by Yumi Matsutoya (Fuyu no Owari).

Cast
Sae Isshiki as Yuko Siina
Takuya Kimura as Masato Katase
Yuki Uchida as Saki Aso
Kijima Sario
Agarita Aki
Watanabe Ko
Chieko Matsubara
Kenjirō Ishimaru
Tomoko Ikuta
Saiki Shigeru
Miki Ryosuke
Akikawa Lisa

Synopsis
This five-part mini series (for Japanese standards) deals with the growing pains of a high school girl who has to deal with bisexuality and how Japanese culture views this. The heroine is a slightly childish girl who has a huge crush on the basketball star player of her school, who in turn has a crush on a new more mature-seeming girl in her class. While the heroine first seems to resent the new girl, she soon finds herself falling in love with her as well, and a strange competition and yet companionship develops between her and her former crush, the basketball player.

External links
Entry on Jdorama

1992 Japanese television series debuts
1992 Japanese television series endings
Japanese drama television series
Japanese LGBT-related television shows
Fuji TV original programming
1990s LGBT-related television series
Bisexuality-related television series